The Armenian Gymnastics Federation, also known as the Gymnastics Federation of Armenia, is the regulating body of gymnastics and artistic gymnastics in Armenia, governed by the Armenian Olympic Committee. The headquarters of the federation is located in Yerevan.

History
The Federation was established in 1993 and the current president is Gagik Vanoyan. The Federation is a full member of the International Gymnastics Federation and European Gymnastics. Armenian gymnasts participate in various European, international and Olympic level competitions, including the Gymnastics World Championships.

In June 2016, members of the Federation met with representatives of the National Olympic Committee of Armenia who congratulated the Armenian athletes for registering excellent results in the European Championships.

In August 2021, former mayor of Yerevan Hayk Marutyan hosted representatives of the Armenian gymnastics team, and awarded them with honors following the teams success at the 2020 Olympic Games.

In December 2021, the Federation hosted an event at the Karen Demirchyan Complex honoring gymnasts following the European Gymnastics Championships.

See also
 Albert Azaryan (former President of the Armenian Gymnastics Federation)
 Sport in Armenia

References

External links 
 Armenian Gymnastics Federation on Facebook

Sports governing bodies in Armenia
Gymnastics in Armenia
Armenia